A number of sportspeople eligible for the 2020 Summer Olympics in Tokyo stated that they would not attend because of the COVID-19 pandemic in Japan. In the case of tennis, media speculated that some absentees were unenthusiastic about competing in any case and used COVID-19 as a convenient excuse.

List

Qualified but withdrew due to postponement or COVID-19 concerns

Qualified but withdrew due to testing positive for COVID-19

See also
 List of athletes not attending the 2022 Winter Olympics due to COVID-19 concerns
 List of athletes not attending the 2020 Summer Paralympics due to COVID-19 concerns
 List of athletes not attending the 2016 Summer Olympics due to Zika virus concerns

References

Lists of competitors at the 2020 Summer Olympics